Abhishek Kaushik can refer to:

 Abhishek Kaushik (cricketer, born 1985), Indian cricketer
 Abhishek Kaushik (cricketer, born 1994), Indian cricketer